, also known as Digimon Adventure: Children's War Game! is a 2000 Japanese anime short film directed by Mamoru Hosoda and produced by Toei Animation. A part of the Digimon media franchise, Our War Game is a sequel to the 1999 anime television series Digimon Adventure, the first to use digital ink and paint, and is the second Digimon film overall. The film premiered in Japan on March 4, 2000 as part of the Toei Anime Fair (being screened alongside One Piece); in North America, portions of Our War Game were included in the 2000 film Digimon: The Movie. Hosoda has cited Our War Game! as a major influence on his 2009 film Summer Wars, with critics noting numerous similarities between the films.

Plot
Following the return of the DigiDestined from the Digital World, Koshiro Izumi discovers a corrupted Digimon on the internet that grows by consuming data. He travels to the home of Taichi Yagami, where they observe its consumption disrupt computer systems across Japan. Taichi and Koshiro are contacted by their Digimon partners Agumon and Tentomon from the Digital World; they battle the corrupted Digimon, but are defeated.

Taichi and Koshiro attempt to contact the other DigiDestined by phone, but discover that the national PSTN has crashed. Using an emergency voicemail system, they are able to contact Yamato Ishida and Takeru Takaishi, who are visiting their grandmother in rural Shimane. Yamato and Takeru's Digimon partners Gabumon and Patamon join the fight, but are physically slowed as a result of thousands of e-mails being sent to Taichi and Koshiro by other children observing the battle on their computers around the world.

The enemy Digimon, having evolved into Diablomon, creates thousands of duplicates of itself and hacks The Pentagon to launch an LGM-118 Peacekeeper missile at Tokyo. Taichi and Yamato magically enter their computers, and rally their Digimon to jointly evolve into Omegamon and defeat the duplicates. Koshiro forwards the thousands of emails to the original Diablomon, slowing him enough to be defeated. With Diablomon vanquished, the disarmed missile crashes harmlessly into Tokyo Bay.

Cast

Production

Our War Game was directed by Mamoru Hosoda, written by Reiko Yoshida, and produced by Toei Animation. It is the second of two Digimon movies directed by Hosoda, following 1999's Digimon Adventure. Hosoda was given both Digimon films to direct by the company after he expressed a desire to make movies. Hosoda pitched two plots for the film: a road movie inspired by Midnight Run in which Kamiya and an original character travel to Okinawa, and a WarGames-inspired film in which the protagonist saves the world without leaving their home. Toei selected the latter concept. In early drafts of the script, Our War Game focused on a plot where the Year 2000 problem was caused by a Digimon. Hosoda stated that he wished to use the film to make the problem more understandable for children, but later abandoned the concept, believing the film would become dated after the year 2000 had passed; references to the Year 2000 problem nonetheless appear in some promotional materials for the film.

Constrained by the 40 minute runtime of Our War Game and seeking to make a film less serious than Digimon Adventure, Hosoda created Our War Game as a "childish, simple story where you just have to enjoy the thrill." Noting that he "couldn't make a great emotional story" in 40 minutes, he narrowed the focus of the film from the television anime series' ensemble cast of eight characters and their Digimon partners to just four core characters  Kamiya, Ishida, Izumi, and Takaishi. Inspired by the 1994 film Speed, he structured the film around a countdown to add suspense, with the events of the film occurring approximately in real time.

The film's soundtrack is composed by Takanori Arisawa, who composed the soundtrack for the Digimon television anime series. Maurice Ravel's Boléro and "When Johnny Comes Marching Home" are used as motifs, the latter of which was included by Hosoda as a reference to its use in the bomb run scene in Dr. Strangelove. The song "Requiem", which is sung during the climax by The Little Singers of Tokyo, is a revision of "Pie Jesu", a traditional Catholic hymn. "Butter-Fly" by Kōji Wada is used as the film's opening theme song, while "Sakuhin No. 2 "Haru" I Chōchō ~ Bokura no War Game!" by AiM is used as the closing theme. The film's soundtrack is included on the album Digimon Adventure 02 Uta to Ongaku Shū Ver.1.

Release
Our War Game was released in theaters in Japan on March 4, 2000. The film was released on the same day as One Piece: The Movie as part of the Spring 2000 Toei Anime Fair; limited edition Digimon Carddass cards were included with advance ticket purchases for the film. The film grossed a total of ¥2.16 billion at the box office.

The film was released on VHS for rental on July 14, 2000, and for purchase on November 21, 2000. A DVD collecting Our War Game and the 1999 film Digimon Adventure was released on October 13, 2000 for rental, and on January 21, 2001 for purchase. The film was released for free on YouTube from March 22 to April 16, 2018, and on Bandai Channel from May 3 to May 9, 2020.

In North America, footage from Our War Game was edited with footage from the films Digimon Adventure (1999) and Digimon Adventure 02: Digimon Hurricane Landing!! / Transcendent Evolution!! The Golden Digimentals (2000) to create Digimon: The Movie, which was released in theaters on October 6, 2000.

Reception and legacy
In Anime Impact: The Movies and Shows that Changed the World of Japanese Animation, critic Geoffrey G. Thew assesses Our War Game favorably. He notes that the theatrical release Our War Game immediately preceded the release of the 2000 television anime series Digimon Adventure 02, which introduced a new central cast of characters; he argues that Our War Game "plays heavily on the audience's nostalgia" for the original cast of Digimon Adventure, noting that "without our emotional investment [...] the film would be little more than eye candy."

Our War Game is regarded as a "blueprint" for Hosoda's 2009 film Summer Wars, with critics noting similarities in plot, visuals, and thematic material between the films. The anime magazine Neo stated that Our War Game is "plainly a prototype" of Summer Wars, and Thew argues in Anime Impact that Summer Wars is an effective remake of Our War Game "without any of the constraints of the Digimon license." Thew asserts that Our War Game and Summer Wars "speak to how the world (and Internet) changed in the decade between the two films. Our War Game is about the then-novel ideal of connecting with old friends over the internet, whereas Summer Wars explores the idea of getting to know total strangers intimatelyan equally novel idea at the time the film was made." Hosoda has stated that Our War Game "kind of started my idea for Summer Wars," noting that Summer Wars "became the feature-length version of that idea" and allowed him to explore material he was unable to in Our War Game'''s 40 minute runtime.

Critics have cited the 1983 film WarGames as an influence on Our War Game, with Thew noting that both films share a title and a plot of "a rogue AI hijacking the Internet to spread chaos and potentially destroy the world, only to be stopped by some kids on their computers."

In other Digimon media, Diaboromon returns as the antagonist of the 2001 film Digimon Adventure 02: Revenge of Diaboromon, which contains visual callbacks to Our War Game. The first appearance of Omnimon in the 2020 reboot of Digimon Adventure similarly contains visual callbacks to Our War Game''.

Notes

References

External links
 
 

2000 films
2000 anime films
Adventure anime and manga
Animated adventure films
Digimon films
Films set in 1999
Films directed by Mamoru Hosoda
Films set in Japan
Films set in Shimane Prefecture
Japanese fantasy adventure films
Japanese sequel films
Toei Animation films